Karol Beck was the defending champion, but chose not to participate this year.
Evgeny Donskoy won the tournament by defeating Albano Olivetti 6–1, 7–6(13–11) in the final.

Seeds

Draw

Finals

Top half

Bottom half

References
 Main draw
 Qualifying draw

Singles
2012